Baio is a surname. Notable people with the name include:

 Andy Baio, American technologist and blogger
 Chris Baio, American bassist, member of indie rock band Vampire Weekend
 Jimmy Baio, American actor
 Scott Baio, American actor
 Yalany Baio, Bissau-Guinean football player

See also
 Baio (disambiguation)

surnames